Ouk Chanthan (born 11 March 1974) is a Cambodian sprinter. She competed in the 100 metres at the 1996 Summer Olympics and the 2000 Summer Olympics. With a time of 14.14 seconds, Chanthan finished 84th and last overall of all athletes in the women's 100 metres at the 2000 Summer Games and she did not progress to the second round of the competition.

References

External links
 

1974 births
Living people
Athletes (track and field) at the 1996 Summer Olympics
Athletes (track and field) at the 2000 Summer Olympics
Cambodian female sprinters
Olympic athletes of Cambodia
Place of birth missing (living people)
Olympic female sprinters